Grammoechus javanicus is a species of beetle in the family Cerambycidae. It was described by Stephan von Breuning in 1938. It is known from Java and Borneo.

References

Pteropliini
Beetles described in 1938